Louise Herlinveaux is a Canadian curler.

Awards
British Columbia Curling Hall of Fame: 1995, together with all of the Pat Sanders 1987 team.
British Columbia Sports Hall of Fame: 1996, together with all of the 1987 Pat Sanders Rink.
Greater Victoria Sports Hall of Fame: 1997

Teams and events

Women's

Mixed

Private life
She works for British Columbia Government Directory as Senior Infrastructure Architect for Technical Services and Operations.

References

External links
 
 Louise Herlinveaux – Curling Canada Stats Archive

Living people
Curlers from Victoria, British Columbia
Canadian women curlers
World curling champions
Canadian women's curling champions
Canadian mixed curling champions
Year of birth missing (living people)